Dunchad may refer to any of several historical figures, several of them of the Clan Duncan; see also Donnchadh:
Dúnchad Muirisci (died 683), king of Connacht
Dunchad I of Iona, abbot of Iona 707-717
Cellach mac Dunchad, one of the kings of Leinster
Dúnchad mac Conaing or Dúnchad mac Dubáin, king of Dál Riata (died 654)
Dúnchad Bec (died 721), a king in Dál Riata
Duchad of Reims, master of one of the Carolingian Schools important in the Carolingian renaissance
Duchad, abbot of Dunkeld,  killed in the battle of Dorsum Crup (Duncrub in Perthshire), 965
A "Dunchad" was the ninth-century writer of glosses on Martianus Capella's didactic encyclopedia